Maroon 5 has received several awards and nominations including three Grammy Awards out of 10 nominations; 8 awards out of 40 nominations at the Billboard Music Awards; three American Music Awards; three People's Choice Awards; and an award at the MTV Video Music Awards. The band also received four nominations at the BRIT Awards.

4Music Video Honours
The 4Music Video Honours is an annual music awards show by 4Music, a music and entertainment channel in the United Kingdom and available on some digital television providers in the Republic of Ireland.

!
|-
| align="center"| 2011
| "Moves Like Jagger" 
| Best Video
| 
| style="text-align:center;" | 
|-
|}

American Music Awards
The American Music Awards are awarded annually by a poll of music buyers. Maroon 5 has received 3 awards from 12 nominations.

|-
| align="center"| 2004
| rowspan="6"| Maroon 5
| Favorite Breakthrough Artist
|
|-
| align="center"| 2005
| Favorite Adult Contemporary Artist
| 
|-
| align="center"| 2007
| Favorite Pop/Rock Band/Duo/Group
| 
|-
| align="center"| 2011
| Favorite Pop/Rock Band/Duo/Group
| 
|-
| align="center" rowspan="3"| 2012
| Artist of the Year
| 
|-
| Favorite Pop/Rock Band/Duo/Group
| 
|-
| Overexposed
| Favorite Pop/Rock Album
| 
|-
| align="center"| 2013
| rowspan="3"| Maroon 5
| Favorite Adult Contemporary Artist
| 
|-
| align="center" rowspan="2"| 2015
| Artist of the Year
| 
|-
| Favorite Pop/Rock Band/Duo/Group
| 
|-
| align="center"| 2017
| "Don't Wanna Know" 
| Collaboration of the Year
| 
|-
| align="center"| 2018
| rowspan="5"| Maroon 5
| Favorite Pop/Rock Band/Duo/Group
| 
|-
| align="center"| 2019
| rowspan="2"| Favorite Adult Contemporary Artist
| 
|-
| rowspan="2" align="center"| 2020
| 
|-
| Favorite Pop/Rock Band/Duo/Group
| 
|-
| align="center"| 2021
| Favorite Pop/Duo/Group
| 
|}

APRA Awards

|-
| rowspan="2"|2005 || "This Love" || rowspan="2"| Most Performed Foreign Work || 
|-
| "She Will Be Loved" || 
|-
| 2012 || "Moves Like Jagger"  || rowspan="2"| International Work of the Year || 
|-
| 2016 || "Sugar" || 
|-

ASCAP Pop Music Awards
The ASCAP Pop Music Awards is an annual awards ceremony hosted by the American Society of Composers, Authors and Publishers. Maroon 5 has received 23 awards.

!
|-
| rowspan="3"| 2005
| "Harder to Breathe"
| rowspan="3"| Most Performed Songs
| 
| style="text-align:center;" rowspan="3"| 
|-
| "She Will Be Loved"
| 
|-
| "This Love"
| 
|-
| rowspan="2"| 2006
| "She Will Be Loved" 
| Top 5 Most Performed Songs
|  
| style="text-align:center;" rowspan="2"| 
|-
| "This Love"
| rowspan="5"| Most Performed Songs
| 
|-
| 2009
| "Wake Up Call"
| 
| style="text-align:center;"| 
|-
| 2011
| "Misery"
| 
| style="text-align:center;"| 
|-
| 2012
| rowspan="2"| "Moves Like Jagger" 
| 
| style="text-align:center;"| 
|-
| rowspan="3"| 2013
| 
| style="text-align:center;"| 
|-
| "One More Night" 
| Songwriter of the Year
|  
| style="text-align:center;"| 
|-
| "Payphone" 
| Most Performed Song
| 
| style="text-align:center;"| 
|-
| rowspan="2"| 2014
| "Daylight" 
| rowspan="2"| Songwriter of the Year 
|  
| style="text-align:center;" rowspan="2"| 
|-
| "One More Night" 
|  
|-
| 2015
| rowspan="2"| "Animals" 
| rowspan="3"| Most Performed Songs
| 
| style="text-align:center;"| 
|-
| rowspan="2"| 2016
|  
| style="text-align:center;" rowspan="2"| 
|-
| "Sugar"
| 
|-
| rowspan="3"| 2018 
| "Cold" 
| rowspan="6"| Award Winning Songs
|  
| style="text-align:center;" rowspan="3"| 
|-
| "Don't Wanna Know" 
| 
|-
| "What Lovers Do" 
| 
|- 
| rowspan="2"| 2019 
| "Girls Like You"  
|  
| style="text-align:center;" rowspan="2"| 
|-
| "Wait"
| 
|-
| 2020
| "Memories" 
|  
| style="text-align:center;" | 
|-
| 2022
| "Beautiful Mistakes" 
| Winning Songwriters & Publishers
| 
| style="text-align:center;" |

Billboard

Billboard Music Awards
The Billboard Music Awards are sponsored by Billboard magazine and are held annually in May (previously December). Maroon 5 have received 8 awards from 29 nominations.

|-
| rowspan="9" align="center"| 2005
|rowspan="5"| Maroon 5
|Digital Artist of the Year
|
|-
|Artist of the Year
|
|-
|Duo/Group Artist of the Year
|
|-
|Hot 100 Artist of the Year
|
|-
|Mainstream Top 40 Artist of the Year
|
|-
|rowspan="4"| "This Love"
|Hot 100 Single of the Year
|
|-
|Mainstream Top 40 Single of the Year
|
|-
|Digital Track of the Year
|
|-
|Top Hot Adult Top 40 Track
|
|-
|align="center"|2007
|It Won't Be Soon Before Long
|Top Digital Album
|
|-
|rowspan="5" align="center"|2012
|rowspan="4" |"Moves Like Jagger"
|Top 100 Song
|
|-
|Top Streaming Song
|
|-
|Top Digital Song
|
|-
|Top Pop Song
|
|-
|rowspan="7"| Maroon 5
|Top Group/Duo
|
|-
|rowspan="14" align="center"|2013
|Top Artist
|
|-
|Top 100 Artist
|
|-
|Top Radio Songs Artist
|
|-
|Top Digital Songs Artist
|
|-
|Top Duo/Group
|
|-
|Top Pop Artist
|
|-
|rowspan="4"|"Payphone"
|Top 100 Song
|
|-
|Top Radio Song
|
|-
|Top Pop Song
|
|-
|Top Digital Song
|
|-
|rowspan="3"|"One More Night"
|Top 100 Song
|
|-
|Top Radio Song
|
|-
|Top Pop Song
|
|-
|Overexposed
|Top Pop Album
|
|-
|rowspan="3" align="center"|2015
|rowspan="2"|Maroon 5
|Top Duo/Group
|
|-
|Top Radio Songs Artist
|
|-
|V
|Top Billboard 200 Album
|
|-
|align="center"|2016
|rowspan="3"| Maroon 5
|Top Duo/Group
|
|-
| rowspan=7 align="center"|2019
| Top Duo/Group
| 
|-
|Top Radio Songs Artist
|
|-
| rowspan="5"| "Girls Like You" 
| Top Hot 100 Song
| 
|-
| Top Streaming Song (Video)
| 
|-
| Top Collaboration
| 
|-
| Top Radio Song
| 
|-
| Top Selling Song
| 
|-
| align="center"|2020
|rowspan="2"| Maroon 5
|rowspan="2"| Top Duo/Group
| 
|-
| align="center"|2021
| 
|-
|}

Billboard Japan Music Awards
Founded by Billboard Japan, the Billboard Japan Music Awards honor artists, both Japanese and foreign, who had achieved best results in Billboard Japan charts.

!
|-
| rowspan="2" style="text-align:center;"| 2010
| rowspan="2"| "Misery"
| Hot 100 Airplay of the Year 
| 
| style="text-align:center;" rowspan="2"| 
|-
| Adult Contemporary of the Year
| 
|-
|}

BMI Pop Awards
The BMI Pop Awards are held annually to recognize people in pop culture. Maroon 5 has received 27 awards.

!
|-
| rowspan="2"| 2005
| "Harder to Breathe"
| Song of the Year
| 
| style="text-align:center;" rowspan="2"| 
|-
| "This Love"
| Pop Award
| 
|-
| rowspan="3"| 2006
| "She Will Be Loved"
| Song of the Year 
| 
| style="text-align:center;" rowspan="3"| 
|-
| "Sunday Morning"
| Songwriter of the Year 
| 
|-
| "This Love"
| Pop Award
| 
|-
| 2008
| "Makes Me Wonder"
| rowspan="6"| Award Winning Songs
| 
| style="text-align:center;"| 
|-
| rowspan="2"| 2009
| "Wake Up Call"
| 
| style="text-align:center;" rowspan="2"| 
|-
| "Won't Go Home Without You"
| 
|-
| 2011
| "Misery"
| 
| style="text-align:center;"| 
|-
| 2012
| "Never Gonna Leave This Bed"
| 
| style="text-align:center;"| 
|-
| rowspan="5"| 2013
| rowspan="3"| "Moves like Jagger" 
| 
| style="text-align:center;" rowspan="5"| 
|-
| Song of the Year
| 
|-
| Songwriter of the Year 
| 
|-
| rowspan="2"| "Payphone" 
| Award Winning Song
| 
|-
| Songwriter of the Year 
| 
|-
| rowspan="6"| 2014
| rowspan="2"| "Daylight"
| Award Winning Song
| 
| style="text-align:center;" rowspan="6"|
|-
| Songwriter of the Year 
| 
|-
| rowspan="2"| "Love Somebody"
| Award Winning Song
| 
|-
| Songwriter of the Year 
| 
|-
| rowspan="2"| "One More Night"
| Award Winning Song
| 
|-
| Songwriter of the Year 
| 
|-
| rowspan="2"| 2015
| rowspan="2"| "Maps"
| Award Winning Song
| 
| style="text-align:center;" rowspan="2"| 
|-
| Songwriter of the Year 
| 
|-
| rowspan="3"| 2016
| "Animals"
| rowspan="4"| Award Winning Songs
| 
| style="text-align:center;" rowspan="3"|  
|-
| "Sugar"
| 
|-
| "This Summer's Gonna Hurt like a Motherfucker"
| 
|-
| rowspan="3"| 2018
| rowspan="2"| "Cold" 
| 
| style="text-align:center;" rowspan="3"| 
|-
| Songwriter of the Year 
| 
|-
| "Don't Wanna Know" 
| rowspan="5"| Award Winning Songs
| 
|-
| rowspan="3"| 2019
| "Girls Like You" 
| 
| style="text-align:center;" rowspan="3"|
|-
| "Wait"
| 
|-
| "What Lovers Do" 
| 
|-
| 2021
| "Memories"
| 
| style="text-align:center;"| 
|-
| rowspan="2"| 2022
| "Beautiful Mistakes" 
| Most Performed Songs of the Year 
| 
| style="text-align:center;" rowspan="2"| 
|-
| "Nobody's Love"
| Songwriter of the Year 
| 
|-
|}

Bravo Otto
Established in 1957, the Bravo Otto is an accolade presented by the German magazine Bravo. 

!
|-
| 2004
| rowspan="2"| Maroon 5
| Best Rock Band
| 
| style="text-align:center;"| 
|-
| 2020
| Best Band / Duo
| 
| style="text-align:center;"|
|-
|}

Brit Awards
The Brit Awards are held annually and were created by the British Phonographic Industry. Maroon 5 have received 4 nominations.

|-
|rowspan="3"|2005
|Songs About Jane
|International Album
|
|-
|rowspan="2"|Maroon 5
|International Breakthrough Act
|
|-
|International Group
|
|-
|rowspan="1"|2012
|Maroon 5
|International Group
|

Canadian Radio Music Awards
The Canadian Radio Music Awards is an annual series of awards presented by the Canadian Association of Broadcasters that are part of Canadian Music Week.

|-
|align="center"| 2013
| Maroon 5
| International Group of the Year 
| 
|}

CD Shop Awards

|-
| align="center"| 2011
| Hands All Over
| Western Music Award
| 
|}

Cyworld Digital Music Awards

|-
| align="center" rowspan="2"| 2011
| style="text-align:center;" rowspan="3"| "Moves Like Jagger" 
| International Artist of the Month – July
| 
|-
| International Artist of the Month – August
| 
|-
| align="center" rowspan="5"| 2012
| International Artist of the Month – March
| 
|-
| style="text-align:center;"| "Payphone" 
| International Artist of the Month – April
| 
|-
| style="text-align:center;" rowspan="3"| "One More Night"
| International Artist of the Month – July
| 
|-
| International Artist of the Month – August
| 
|-
| International Artist of the Month – October
| 
|-

Echo Awards
The Echo Music Awards are held annually and are granted by the Deutsche Phono-Akademie. Maroon 5 have received 2 nominations.

|-
|align="center"| 2005
|Maroon 5
|Best International Newcomer
|
|-
|align="center"| 2009
|Maroon 5
|Best International Group (Beste Gruppe International Rock/Pop)
|
|-

Environmental Media Awards
The Environmental Media Awards is an award ceremony which celebrates the entertainment industry's environmental efforts. Maroon 5 has received the Futures Award for a donation green living campaign by Global Cool, with the 2005 Honda Civic Tour.

!
|-
| 2006
| Maroon 5
| EMA Futures Award
| 
| style="text-align:center;"| 
|-

GAFFA Awards

GAFFA Awards (Denmark)
Delivered since 1991, the GAFFA Awards are a Danish award that rewards popular music by the magazine of the same name.

!
|-
| rowspan="2"| 2004
| Maroon 5
| Best Foreign New Act
| 
| style="text-align:center;" rowspan="2"|
|-
| "This Love"
| Best Foreign Song
| 
|-
| 2018
| Maroon 5
| Best Foreign Band
| 
| style="text-align:center;" |
|-
|}

GAFFA Awards (Norway) 
Maroon 5 has received 1 nomination.

|-
| align="center"| 2018
| Girls Like You 
| Best Foreign Song  
|
|-

Gaon Chart Music Awards
The Gaon Chart Music Awards is an annual awards show in South Korea presented by the national music record chart, Gaon Chart. Maroon 5 has received 4 awards.

!
|-
| align="center"| 2011
| "Moves Like Jagger"  
| rowspan="4"| International Song of the Year
| 
| style="text-align:center;"| 
|-
| align="center"| 2012
| "Payphone"
|
| style="text-align:center;"| 
|-
| align="center"| 2014
| "Maps"
|
| style="text-align:center;"| 
|-
| align="center"| 2016
| "Don't Wanna Know"
|
| style="text-align:center;"| 
|-

Gaygalan Awards
Since 1999, the Gaygalan Awards are a Swedish accolade presented by the QX magazine.

!
|- 
| 2012
| "Moves Like Jagger" 
| Foreign Song of the Year
| 
|style="text-align:center;"| 
|-
|}

Global Awards
The Global Awards celebrate the stars of music, news & entertainment across genres in the UK and from around the world. Maroon 5 has received 3 nominations.

|-
| rowspan="2" align="center"| 2019
| rowspan="3" |Maroon 5 
| Best Group
| 
|-
| Mass Appeal Award
| 
|-
| rowspan="1" align="center"| 2020 
| Best Group
| 
|-

Grammy Awards
The Grammy Awards are awarded annually by the National Academy of Recording Arts and Sciences in the United States. Maroon 5 have received 3 awards and 10 nominations.

|-
| rowspan="2" align="center"| 2005
| Maroon 5
| Best New Artist
| 
|-
| "She Will Be Loved"
| rowspan="3"| Best Pop Performance by a Duo or Group with Vocals
| 
|-
| align="center"| 2006
| "This Love" (Live – Friday the 13th)
| 
|-
| rowspan="2" align="center"| 2008
| "Makes Me Wonder"
|
|-
| It Won't Be Soon Before Long
| Best Pop Vocal Album
| 
|-
| rowspan="2" align="center"| 2009
| "Won't Go Home Without You"
| Best Pop Performance by a Duo or Group with Vocals
| 
|-
| "If I Never See Your Face Again" 
| Best Pop Collaboration with Vocals
| 
|-
| align="center"| 2011
| "Misery"
| Best Pop Performance by a Duo or Group with Vocals
| 
|-
| align="center"| 2012
| "Moves Like Jagger" 
| rowspan="2"| Best Pop Duo/Group Performance
| 
|-
| rowspan="2" align="center"| 2013
| "Payphone" 
| 
|-
| Overexposed
| Best Pop Vocal Album
| 
|-
| align="center"| 2016
| "Sugar"
| rowspan="2" | Best Pop Duo/Group Performance
| 
|-
| align="center"| 2019
| "Girls Like You" 
|

Idolator Music Video Awards

!
|-
| rowspan="2" align="center"| 2011
| rowspan="2"| "Moves like Jagger" 
| Best Music Video Featuring People  Impersonating Pop Stars
| 
| align="center" rowspan="2"| 
|-
| Best Music Video Somehow Associated  with Mick Jagger
|

iHeartRadio

iHeartRadio Much Music Video Awards
The iHeartRadio Much Music Video Awards are awarded annually presented by the Canadian music video channel Much. Maroon 5 has received 6 nominations.

|-
| align="center"|2005
| "She Will Be Loved"
|Favorite International Group
|
|-
|align="center"| 2008
| "Wake Up Call"
| Best International Video – Group
|
|-
|align="center"|2012
| "Moves Like Jagger"
| rowspan="3"| International Video of the Year – Group
|
|-
|align="center"| 2013
| "Payphone"
|
|-
|align="center"| 2014
| "Love Somebody"
|
|-
|align="center"| 2018
|Maroon 5
| Fan Fave Duo or Group
|

iHeartRadio Music Awards
The iHeartRadio Music Awards is an international music awards show founded by iHeartRadio in 2014. Maroon 5 has received two awards. 

|-
| rowspan="1" align="center"| 2014
| rowspan="3"| Maroon 5
| Artist of the Year
| 
|-
| rowspan="1" align="center"| 2016
| Best Duo/Group of the Year
| 
|-
| rowspan="2" align="center"| 2018
| Best Duo/Group of the Year
| 
|-
| rowspan="1"| "Don't Wanna Know" 
| Collaboration of the Year 
| 
|-
| rowspan="6" align="center"| 2019
| Maroon 5
| Best Duo/Group of the Year
| 
|-
| rowspan="5"| "Girls Like You" (ft. Cardi B)
|-
| Song of the Year
| 
|-
| Best Lyrics
| 
|-
| Best Music Video
| 
|-
| Best Collaboration
| 
|-
| align="center"| 2020
|rowspan="3"|Maroon 5
|rowspan="3"|Best Duo/Group of the Year
| 
|-
| align="center"| 2021
| 
|-
| rowspan="2" align="center"| 2022
| 
|-
| 2021 Tour
| Favorite Tour Photographer 
| 
|}

iHeartRadio Titanium Awards
The IHeartRadio Titanium Awards are awarded annually to songs that have received over one billion radio spins in the United States.
!
|-
| align="center"| 2019
| "Girls Like You" 
| Winning Song 
| 
| style="text-align:center;"| 
|-
| align="center"| 2020
| "Memories"
| Winning Song 
| 
| style="text-align:center;"| 
|}

International Dance Music Awards

!
|-
| align="center"| 2012
| "Moves Like Jagger" 
| Best Pop/Dance Track
| 
|style="text-align:center;"| 
|}

Joox Music Awards

Joox Malaysia Music Awards

!
|-
| align="center"| 2020
| Maroon 5
| Top 5 International Artist of the Year 
| 
| style="text-align:center;" |
|-
|}

Joox Thailand Music Awards

!
|-
| rowspan="2"| 2022
| Maroon 5
| Top Social Global Artist of the Year
| 
| rowspan="2" style="text-align:center;" |
|-
| "Beautiful Mistakes" 
| International Song of the Year
| 
|-
|}

Juno Awards
The Juno Awards are held annually by the Canadian Academy of Recording Arts and Sciences. Maroon 5 received two nominations.

|-
|align="center"| 2013
|Overexposed
|International Album of the Year
|
|-
|align="center"| 2019
|Red Pill Blues
|International Album of the Year
|

LOS40 Music Awards
The LOS40 Music Awards, formerly Los Premios 40 Principales, is an annual Spanish awards show that recognises the people and works of pop musicians. Maroon 5 have received four nominations.

|-
| rowspan="4" align="center"|2012
| "Moves Like Jagger" 
| Best Non-Spanish Language International Song
| 
|-
| "Payphone" 
| Best International Song   
| 
|-
| Maroon 5
| Best Non-Spanish Language International Artist/Group
| 
|-
| Overexposed
| Best Non-Spanish Language International Album
| 
|-
| rowspan="2" align="center"|2015
| Maroon 5
| Best International Act
| 
|-
|V
| Best International Album
|

Melon Music Awards

|-
| align="center"| 2012
| "Payphone" 
| Best Pop Award
| 
|-
| align="center"| 2017
| "Don't Wanna Know" 
| Best Pop Award
|

MP3 Music Awards
The MP3 Music Award is an annual awards ceremony established in 2007 to celebrate the most popular artists, bands, MP3 players and MP3 retailers in today's world of music. Maroon 5 has received one nomination.

!
|-
| 2011
| "Moves Like Jagger" (with Christina Aguilera)
| Music Industry Award
| 
| style="text-align:center;"| 
|-
|}

MTV

MTV Asia Awards
The MTV Asia Awards were established in 2002 by MTV Asia. Maroon 5 received one award.

|-
| align="center"| 2005
|"She Will Be Loved"
|Best Video
|

MTV Europe Music Awards
The MTV Europe Music Awards were established in 1994 by MTV Europe to celebrate the most popular music videos in Europe. Maroon 5 received one award.

|-
| rowspan="3" align="center"| 2004
|This Love
|Best Song
|
|-
|rowspan="4"|Maroon 5
|Best Group
|
|-
|Best New Act
|
|-
| align="center"| 2012
|Best World Stage Performance
|
|-
|2018
|Best Group
|

MTV Italian Music Awards
The MTV Italian Music Awards were established in 2006 by MTV Italy. 

!
|-
| 2012
| "Moves Like Jagger" 
| Best Video
| 
|style="text-align:center;"| 
|-
|}

MTV Millennial Awards

!
|-
| 2015
| "Sugar"
| International Hit of the Year
| 
| style="text-align:center;"| 
|-
|}

MTV Video Music Awards
The MTV Video Music Awards were established in 1984 by MTV to celebrate the music videos of the year. Maroon 5 have won 1 award from 8 nominations.

!
|-
| rowspan="2" align="center"| 2004
| rowspan="2"| "This Love"
| Best New Artist
| 
| style="text-align:center;" rowspan="2"| 
|-
| Best Group Video
| 
|-
| align="center"| 2007
| Maroon 5
| Best Group
| 
|
|-
| align="center"| 2012
| "Payphone" 
| Best Pop Video
| 
| style="text-align:center;"| 
|-
| align="center"| 2015
| "Sugar"
| Best Pop Video
| 
| style="text-align:center;"| 
|-
| rowspan="2" align="center"| 2018
| "Wait"
| Best Visual Effects
| 
| style="text-align:center;" rowspan="2"| 
|-
| "Girls Like You" 
| Song of Summer
| 
|-
| align="center"| 2021
| Maroon 5
| Group of the Year
| 
| style="text-align:center;"|

MTV Video Music Awards Japan
The MTV Video Music Awards Japan are held annually since its formation in 2002. Maroon 5 has received 6 nominations.

|-
| align="center"| 2008
|"Makes Me Wonder"
|Best Group Video
|
|-
| align="center" rowspan="2"| 2012
|rowspan="2"|"Moves Like Jagger" 
|Best Group Video
|
|-
|Best Collaboration 
|
|-
| align="center" rowspan="2"| 2013 
| rowspan="2"| "Payphone" 
| Best Group Video
|  
|-
| Best Collaboration 
|  
|-
| 2015
| "Sugar"
| Best Pop Video – International
|

MTV Video Music Awards Latin America
The MTV Video Music Awards Latin America are held annually and are broadcast by MTV. Maroon 5 has received 2 awards from 3 nominations.

|-
| rowspan="2" align="center"| 2004
| rowspan="3"| Maroon 5
| Best New Artist 
| 
|-
| Best Rock Artist (International)
| 
|-
| 2007
| Best Rock Artist (International)
| 
|-

MTV Video Play Awards

!
|-
| align="center"| 2011
| "Moves Like Jagger" 
| Popular Video
| 
| style="text-align:center;"| 
|-
| align="center"| 2018
| "Girls Like You" 
| Winning Video
| 
| style="text-align:center;" | 
|-
|}

Myx Music Awards
Myx Music Awards is an annual awards show in the Philippines that honors the year's both Filipino and International Music. Maroon 5 received 3 nominations.

|-
| 2012
| "Moves Like Jagger" 
| Favorite International Video 
| 
|-
| 2013
| "Payphone" 
| Favorite International Video 
| 
|-
| 2019
| "Girls Like You" 
| International Video of the Year
| 
|-
|}

Nickelodeon Kids' Choice Awards

Nickelodeon Australian Kids' Choice Awards
Maroon 5 has received 1 nomination at the Nickelodeon Australian Kids' Choice Awards.

|-
|align="center"| 2007
| Maroon 5
|Fave International Band
|
|-

Nickelodeon Kids' Choice Awards (US)
Maroon 5 has received 12 nominations at the Nickelodeon Kids' Choice Awards, Maroon 5 also has received the most nominations on this category, and they won for the first time in 2019.

|-
|align="center"| 2013
|rowspan="7" style="text-align:center;"| Maroon 5
| rowspan="7" style="text-align:center;"| Favorite Music Group
|
|-
|align="center"| 2014
|
|-
|align="center"| 2015
|
|-
|align="center"| 2016
|
|-
|align="center"| 2017
|
|-
|align="center"| 2018
|
|-
|rowspan=2 align="center"| 2019
|
|-
| rowspan="1" style="text-align:center;"| "Girls Like You" 
| rowspan="1" style="text-align:center;"| Favorite Collaboration
|
|-
| rowspan="2" align="center"| 2020
| style="text-align:center;"| Maroon 5
| style="text-align:center;"| Favorite Music Group
| 
|-
| style="text-align:center;"| "Memories" 
| style="text-align:center;"| Favorite Song
| 
|-
| align="center"| 2021
| rowspan="2" style="text-align:center;"| Maroon 5
| rowspan="2" style="text-align:center;"| Favorite Music Group
|
|-
| rowspan="2" align="center"| 2022
| 
|-
| style="text-align:center;"| "Beautiful Mistakes" 
| style="text-align:center;"| Favorite Music Collaboration
|

NME Awards
Maroon 5 has received 1 nomination.

|-
| align="center"| 2005
|Maroon 5
|Worst Band
|
|-

Now! Awards

!
|-
| align="center"| 2018
| "Moves Like Jagger" 
| Song of the Teens
| 
|style="text-align:center;"|

NRJ Awards

NRJ Music Awards
The NRJ Music Awards are awarded annually by the radio station NJR. Maroon 5 have received 4 awards from 10 nominations.

|-
| rowspan="2" align="center"| 2005
| Maroon 5
| International Revelation of the Year
| 
|-
| "This Love"
| International Song of the Year
| 
|-
| align="center"| 2008
| Maroon 5
| International Group/Duo of the Year
| 
|-
| align="center"| 2013
| Maroon 5
| International Group/Duo of the Year
| 
|-
|rowspan="2" align="center"| 2015
| Maroon 5
| International Group/Duo of the Year
| 
|-
| "Sugar"
| Video of the Year 
| 
|-
| rowspan="3" align="center"| 2018
| Maroon 5
| International Group/Duo of the Year
| 
|-
| rowspan="2"| "Girls Like You" 
| International Song of the Year
| 
|-
| Video of the Year
| 
|-
| align="center"| 2021
| Maroon 5
| International Band/Duo of the Year
|

NRJ Radio Awards
Maroon 5 has received 2 awards.

|-
| rowspan="2" align="center"| 2005
| Maroon 5
|International Breakout Act
|
|-
|"This Love"
| Best International Song
|
|-

People's Choice Awards
The People's Choice Awards are held annually to recognize people in pop culture. Maroon 5 has received 3 awards from 17 nominations.

|-
| rowspan="2" align="center"| 2008
|Maroon 5
|Favorite Group
|
|-
|"Makes Me Wonder"
|Favorite Rock Song
|
|-
|align="center"| 2009
|rowspan="3"|Maroon 5
|Favorite Group
|
|-
|align="center"| 2011
|Favorite Rock Band
|
|-
| rowspan="2" align="center"| 2012
|Favorite Band
|
|-
|"Moves Like Jagger" 
|Favorite Song of the Year
|
|-
| rowspan="4" align="center"| 2013
|Maroon 5
|Favorite Band
|
|-
|"One More Night"
|Favorite Song
|
|-
|"Payphone"
|Favorite Music Video
|
|-
|Overexposed
|Favorite Album
|
|-
|align="center"| 2014
|rowspan="2"|Maroon 5
|Favorite Band
|
|-
| rowspan="2" align="center"| 2015
|Favorite Group/Band
|
|-
|"Maps"
|Favorite Song
|
|-
| align="center"|2016
| rowspan="2"| Maroon 5
| Favorite Group/Band
| 
|-
| rowspan="2" align="center"| 2018
| Group of the Year
| 
|-
| rowspan="1"| "Girls Like You" 
| Music Video of the Year
| 
|-
| align="center"| 2021
| Maroon 5
| The Group of 2021
|

People's Telly Awards

!
|-
| rowspan="7" align="center"| 2010
| rowspan="7"| "Story"
| Campaign – Not for Profit
| rowspan="5" 
| style="text-align:center;" rowspan="7"| 
|-
| Music Video
|-
| Editing
|-
| Graphics
|-
| Music Video / Concert
|-
| Videography / Cinematography
| rowspan="2" 
|-
| People's Telly Video
|-

Pollstar Awards

!
|-
| align="center"| 2021
| Maroon 5
| Touring Artist of the Decade
| 
| 
|-
| align="center"| 2022
| 2021 Tour
| Best Pop Tour
| 
|

PopCrush Awards

!
|-
| 2011
| "Moves Like Jagger" 
| Song of the Year
| 
|style="text-align:center;"| 
|-
|}

Premios Juventud

!
|-
| 2016
| Maroon 5
| Favorite Hitmaker
| 
| style="text-align:center;"|
|-
|}

Premios Oye!

|-
| rowspan="2"| 2004
| Songs About Jane
| Main English Breakthrough of the Year 
| 
|-
| "This Love"
| Main English Song of the Year
| 
|-
|}

Q Awards
The Q Awards are the United Kingdom's music awards run by the British magazine, Q. Maroon 5 has received 2 nominations.

|-
| rowspan="2" align="center"| 2004
|Maroon 5
|Best New Act
|
|-
|"This Love"
|Best Single
|
|-

Radio Disney Music Awards

|-
| rowspan="1" align="center"| 2015
|"Sugar"
|So Happy — Best Song That Makes You Smile
|
|-
| rowspan="1" align="center"| 2018
|Maroon 5 
|Best Group
|
|}

Radio Music Awards
The Radio Music Awards were held annually to award the most successful song on mainstream radio. Maroon 5 has received 2 nominations.

|-
| rowspan="2" align="center"| 2005
|Maroon 5
|Artist of the Year/Adult Hit Radio
|
|-
|"She Will Be Loved"
|Song of the Year/Adult Hit Radio
|
|-

RTHK International Pop Poll Awards
The RTHK International Pop Poll Awards are sponsored by RTHK.

!
|-
| rowspan="3"| 2005
| rowspan="2"| Maroon 5
| Top Group/Band
| 
| style="text-align:center;" rowspan="3"| 
|-
| Top New Act
| 
|-
| "She Will Be Loved"
| Top 10 International Gold Song
| 
|-
| rowspan="2"| 2008
| Maroon 5
| Top Group/Band
| 
| style="text-align:center;" rowspan="2"| 
|-
| "Makes Me Wonder"
| Top 10 International Gold Song
| 
|-
| 2009
| rowspan="2"| Maroon 5
| rowspan="2"| Top Group/Band
| 
| style="text-align:center;"| 
|-
| rowspan="2" align="center"| 2011 
| 
| style="text-align:center;" rowspan="2"|
|-	
| "Misery"
| Top 10 International Gold Song
| 
|-
| rowspan="2" align="center"| 2012
| Maroon 5
| Top Group/Band
|style="text-align:center; background:#FFD700;"| Gold
| rowspan="2" style="text-align:center;"| 
|-
| "Moves Like Jagger" 
| Top 10 International Gold Song
| 
|-
| rowspan="2"| 2013
| Maroon 5
| Top Group/Band
| 
| rowspan="2" style="text-align:center;" | 
|-
| "Payphone" 
| Top 10 International Gold Song
| 
|-
| align="center" rowspan="2"| 2015
| Maroon 5
| Top Group/Band
| 
| style="text-align:center;" rowspan="2"|
|-
| "Maps"
| Top 10 International Gold Song
| 
|-
| align="center" rowspan="2"| 2016
| Maroon 5
| Top Group/Band
| 
| align="center" rowspan="2"| 
|-
| "This Summer"
| Top 10 International Gold Song
| 
|-
| rowspan="2"| 2018
| Maroon 5
| Top Group/Band
| 
| rowspan="2" style="text-align:center;" |
|-
| "Wait"
| Top 10 International Gold Song
| 
|-
| rowspan="2" align="center"| 2019
| Maroon 5
| Top Group/Band
| style="text-align:center; background:#C0C0C0;"| Silver
| style="text-align:center;" rowspan="2"| 
|-
| "Girls Like You" 
| Top 10 International Gold Song
| 
|-
| rowspan="2" align="center"| 2020
| Maroon 5
| Top Group/Band
| style="text-align:center; background:#C0C0C0;"| Silver
| style="text-align:center;" rowspan="2"| 
|-
| "Memories" 
| Top 10 International Gold Song
| 
|-
| rowspan="2" align="center"| 2022
| Maroon 5
| Top Group/Band 
| style="text-align:center; background:#C0C0C0;"| Silver
| style="text-align:center;" rowspan="2"| 
|-
| "Beautiful Mistakes" 
| Top 10 International Gold Song
| 
|-

Shorty

Shorty Awards

!
|-
| 2017
| "Don't Wanna Know"
| Best Use of Tumblr
| 
| style="text-align:center;"| 
|-
| rowspan="2" align="center"| 2018
| rowspan="2"| Red Pill Blues
| Best Use of Snapchat
| rowspan="2" 
| style="text-align:center;" rowspan="2"| 
|-
| Best Influencer and Celebrity Snapchat Campaign
|-

Shorty Social Good Awards

!
|-
| 2016
| #Maroon5Day
| Best Influencer & Celebrity Partnership
| 
| style="text-align:center;"| 
|-

Teen Choice Awards
The Teen Choice Awards are held annually and presented by Fox Broadcasting Company. Maroon 5 has received 5 awards from 14 nominations.

!
|-
| rowspan="2" align="center"| 2004
| Maroon 5
| Choice Breakout Artist
| 
| style="text-align:center;" rowspan="2"| 
|-
| "This Love"
| Choice Rock Track
| 
|-
| rowspan="4" align="center"| 2005
| Songs About Jane
| Choice Music: Album
| rowspan="4" 
| style="text-align:center;" rowspan="4"|
|-
| rowspan="2"| "She Will Be Loved"
| Choice Music: Single 
|-
| Choice Music: Rock Track 
|-
| "Sunday Morning"
| Choice Music: Love Song 
|-
| rowspan="3" align="center"| 2007
| rowspan="2"|Maroon 5
| Choice Music: Rock Group
| rowspan="3" 
| style="text-align:center;" rowspan="3"| 
|-
| Choice Summer Music Star
|-
| "Makes Me Wonder"
| Choice Music: Rock Track
|-
| rowspan="3" align="center"| 2012
| Maroon 5
| Choice Summer Music Group
| rowspan="2" 
| style="text-align:center;" rowspan="3"| 
|-
| "Moves Like Jagger"
| Choice Music: Single by a Group
|-
| "Payphone"
| Choice Break-Up Song
| 
|-
| rowspan="3" align="center"| 2013
| rowspan="2"| Maroon 5
| Summer Music Star: Group
| 
| style="text-align:center;" rowspan="3"| 
|- 
| Choice Music: Group 
| rowspan="3" 
|-
| "Love Somebody"
| Choice Music Single: Group 
|- 
| rowspan="1" align="center"| 2014
| "Maps"
| Choice Rock Song
| style="text-align:center;"| 
|-
|-
| rowspan="4" align="center"| 2015
| rowspan="2"| Maroon 5
| Choice Music Group: Male
| rowspan="4" 
| style="text-align:center;" rowspan="4"| 
|-
| Choice Summer Music Star: Group
|-
| rowspan="2"| "Sugar"
| Choice Song: Group
|-
| Choice Music: Love Song
|-
| rowspan="3" align="center"| 2017
| rowspan="2"| Maroon 5
| Decade Award
| 
| style="text-align:center;" rowspan="3"| 
|-
| Choice Music Group
| rowspan="2" 
|-
| "Don't Wanna Know"  
| Choice Pop Song
|-
| rowspan="4" align="center"| 2018
| rowspan="2"| Maroon 5
| Choice Summer Group
| rowspan="4" 
| style="text-align:center;" rowspan="4"| 
|-
| Choice Music Group
|-
| "Wait"
| Choice Song: Group
|-
| "Girls Like You" 
| Choice Summer Song
|-

The Tylt's Best of the Decade Awards

!
|-
| 2019
| Maroon 5
| Pop Band of the Decade 
| 
| style="text-align:center;"| 
|-

The V Chart Awards

!
|-
| rowspan="1" align="center"|2016
| Maroon 5
| Top Group
| 
| style="text-align:center;"| 
|-
|}

Vevo Hot This Year Awards

! 
|-
| rowspan="1" style="text-align:center"| 2014
| "Maps"
| Best Duo or Group Video
| 
| style="text-align:center;"| 
|-
|}

Virgin Media Music Awards

!
|-
| rowspan="3"| 2012
|rowspan="3"| "Moves Like Jagger" 
| Best Track
| 
|style="text-align:center;"| 
|-
| Best Collaboration
| 
|style="text-align:center;"| 
|-
| Best Video
| 
|style="text-align:center;"| 
|-
|}

Webby Awards
A Webby Award is an award for excellence on the Internet presented annually by The International Academy of Digital Arts and Sciences.

!
|-
| align="center"| 2018
| Maroon 5.com
| Websites and Mobile Stiles Celebrity / Fan – Honoree
| 
| style="text-align:center;"| 
|-
| align="center"| 2019
| "Girls Like You"
| Music Video (Video) – Honoree
| 
| style="text-align:center;"|

World Music Awards
The World Music Awards are held annually that honors worldwide sales figures. Maroon 5 has received 1 award from 11 nominations.

|-
|align="center"| 2004
|rowspan="4"| Maroon 5
|World's Best New Group
|
|-
|align="center"| 2005
|World's Best Selling Pop Group
|rowspan=10 
|-
|rowspan="9" align="center"|2014
|World's Best Group
|-
|World's Best Live Act
|-
|rowspan="2" |"One More Night"
|World's Best Song
|-
|World's Best Video
|-
|rowspan="2" | "Daylight"
|World's Best Song
|-
|World's Best Video
|-
|rowspan="2" | "Love Somebody"
|World's Best Song
|-
|World's Best Video
|-
|Overexposed
|World's Best Album

Z Awards

!
|-
| 2011
| "Moves Like Jagger" 
| Collaboration of the Year
| 
|style="text-align:center;"| 
|-
|}

References

Awards
Lists of awards received by American musician
Lists of awards received by musical group